This is a list of rediscovered film footage, i.e. for incomplete films for which missing parts were found. See List of incomplete or partially lost films and List of rediscovered films for films which were thought to have been entirely lost.

References

Lists of films